Si Wen (born 14 December 1990) is a Chinese handball player for Shanghai and the Chinese national team.

She participated at the 2017 World Women's Handball Championship.

References

1990 births
Living people
Chinese female handball players
Handball players at the 2018 Asian Games
Asian Games silver medalists for China
Asian Games medalists in handball
Medalists at the 2018 Asian Games